Jorge Risquet Valdés-Saldaña (6 May 1930 – 28 September 2015) was a Cuban revolutionary and politician. He participated in the Sierra Maestra guerrilla campaign during the Cuban Revolution and became later involved in the Angola Civil War. He also participated in peace negotiations between Angola and South Africa, which led to the independence of Namibia and contributed to the release of Nelson Mandela and the end of apartheid. He was member of the Politburo of the Communist Party of Cuba from 1980 to 1991.

Early life and political career 
Risquet grew up in a poor family living in a solar, or a tenement home where a family lived in one room and shared a bathroom with other families. Living in poverty, both of Risquet's parents worked in the tobacco industry and developed a relationship in the Cuban Communist Party, in turn radicalizing Risquet in his youth. Risquet also was politically active in Guatemala, where he represented Latin America in the World Federation of Democratic Youth until the U.S. backed coup in 1954. In Guatemala, Risquet met Argentine doctor and late Cuban revolutionary Ernesto "Che" Guevara. During Batista's rule, Risquet was subjected to torture and imprisoned for five months, due to his leadership in the Popular Socialist Party (PSP). Risquet then fought in the Cuban Revolution, starting in 1958, leading Risquet to become an important figure within the new revolutionary government.

Representing Cuba, in October 1964 Risquet met with Nikita Khrushchev in regards to getting greater Soviet support for Cuba in the face of American hegemony. This meeting fell apart, as Khrushchev was not receptive to aiding Cuba, and, according to Risquet himself, "the tone was bitter." Upon his return from Africa in 1967, Risquet was in multiple government roles, including Minister of Labor, where he led public policy of lambasting Cuban women that stayed at home, rather than committing to working. He additionally worked as an advisor to Raúl Castro in 1991.

Missions to Africa

Congo-Brazzaville and Guinea-Bissau (1965-1967) 
Risquet's start in assistance to Africa was in 1965, when Castro sent him to work with the government of Congo-Brazzaville while Che Guevara fought against CIA-backed mercenaries in Congo-Leopoldville, or Zaire. There, he was integral in mitigating a military coup from taking place, and he additionally was a part of Congo-Brazzaville's first initiative to vaccinate children for polio, and as a result thousands of Congolese youth were inoculated. However, the coup in conjunction with disappointment in the effectiveness of assisting the Angolan MPLA troops from Congo-Brazzaville led Risquet to leave Africa. Risquet's return to Cuba was additionally caused by President Luís Cabral's rejection of additional Cuban assistance in Guinea-Bissau.

Angola (1975-1979) 
Because of his efforts in the Congo and close ties with the MPLA, Risquet was chosen to lead diplomatic relations with Angola once the dictatorship under Portugal fell apart in 1975. In late 1977, after being tasked with leading the Cuban intervention in Angola, Risquet led the bargaining of compensation for more Cuban personnel in Angola after President Agostinho Neto requested for more aid. After about four months of negotiations, the Cuban and Angolan governments came to a consensus in January, greatly expanding the thousands of Cubans providing education and healthcare in the region as the civil war continued. Cuba, however, was economically burdened by the internationalist mission in Angola, and could not support the immense capital and human costs, leading to Risquet returning to Havana in 1979.

Namibia (1978-1991) 
Apartheid South Africa had occupied Namibia as South West Africa since World War I despite a 1971 international court ruling which deemed the occupation illegal. Those native to Namibia were forced onto "homelands" and out of this oppression formed the South West Africa People's Organization (SWAPO). Risquet maintained a diplomatic relationship with SWAPO, taking a hardline approach by persuading SWAPO to take the position that, if Namibian Independence were to occur, then South Africa would also relinquish control of the wealthy Walvis Bay port back to the free Namibia. In 1987, Cuba launched a large-scale attack on SADF troops in southern Angola at Battle of Cuito Cuanavale, leading to negotiations between the United States, Cuba, Angola, and South Africa regarding the end of the South African Border War and Namibian independence. A free Namibia was stipulated in UNSC Resolution 435, yet South Africa would not budge or accept the United Nation's demands. Cuba's upper hand in Southern Angola led Risquet to demand acceptance of Resolution 435, and finally the South African government folded to the Cubans.

References

1930 births
Cuban guerrillas
Cuban revolutionaries
People of the Cuban Revolution
2015 deaths
Che Guevara
Cuban military personnel of the Angolan Civil War